The 2022–23 season is FC Sheriff Tiraspol's 26th season, and their 25th in the Divizia Naţională, the top-flight of Moldovan football. Sheriff are defending Divizia Naţională champions and will also take part in the Moldovan Cup, as well as entering the UEFA Champions League in the first qualifying round.

Season events
On 20 June, Sheriff Tiraspol announced the signing of Abou Ouattara from Valenciennes. The following day, 21 June, Sheriff Tiraspol appointed Stjepan Tomas as their new Head Coach, and the signing of Heron from Vejle. On 22 June, Sheriff Tiraspol announced the signing of Rasheed Akanbi from Kocaelispor.

On 29 June, Sheriff Tiraspol announced the signing of Iyayi Atiemwen from Dinamo Zagreb.

On 12 July, Steve Ambri signed a two-year contract with Sheriff Tiraspol.

On 18 July, Sheriff Tiraspol announced the loan signing of Salifu Mudasiru from Asante Kotoko, with Kay Tejan signing on loan from TOP Oss the following day until December 2022.

On 25 July, Sheriff Tiraspol announced the loan signing of Mouhamed Diop from Kocaelispor,  with Giannis Fivos Botos joining on loan from AEK Athens two days later.

On 13 August, Sheriff Tiraspol announced the signing of Maksym Koval from Al Fateh.

On 27 August, Sheriff Tiraspol announced the signing of Armel Zohouri from Lausanne-Sport.

On 30 August, Sheriff Tiraspol announced the signing of Felipe Vizeu from Udinese.

On 25 October, Head Coach Stjepan Tomas resigned following their first league defeat of the season to Petrocub Hîncești in the Super Liga.

On 9 January, Sheriff Tiraspol announced the return of Roberto Bordin as Head Coach who'd previously been in charge between 2016 and 2018.

On 13 January, Sheriff Tiraspol announced the signing of Munashe Garananga from Dynamo Brest.

On 16 January, Sheriff Tiraspol announced the signing of Amine Talal from Bastia.

On 2 February, Sheriff Tiraspol announced the signing of Michael López from Oulu and Abdoul Tapsoba on loan from Standard Liège.

On 8 February, Sheriff Tiraspol announced the signing of Christ Bekale from O Sidi Bouzid.

On 11 February, Sheriff Tiraspol announced the signing of Bubacarr Tambedou from Paide Linnameeskond.

On 21 February, Sheriff Tiraspol announced the signing of Origbaajo Ismaila on loan from Kyoto Sanga. The following day, 22 February, Danil Ankudinov joined Armenian Premier League club Van on loan for the remainder of the season.

On 11 March, Sheriff Tiraspol announced the return of Ricardinho who'd previously played for the club between 2013 and 2017.

Squad

Out on loan

Transfers

In

Loans in

Out

Loans out

Released

Friendlies

Competitions

Overall record

Super Liga

Phase I

League table

Results summary

Results

Phase II

League table

Results summary

Results

Moldovan Cup

UEFA Champions League

First qualifying round

Second qualifying round

Third qualifying round

UEFA Europa League

Play-off round

Group stage

UEFA Europa Conference League

Knockout phase

Squad statistics

Appearances and goals

|-
|colspan="16"|Players away on loan:

|-
|colspan="16"|Players who left Sheriff Tiraspol during the season:

|}

Goal scorers

Clean sheets

Disciplinary Record

References

External links 
 

FC Sheriff Tiraspol seasons
Sheriff Tiraspol
Sheriff Tiraspol
Moldovan football clubs 2022–23 season